Halliford School is a selective boys independent day school, which also admits girls into its sixth form, in Lower Halliford, Shepperton, Surrey, England. The school is a member of the Headmasters' and Headmistresses' Conference (HMC). The current Headmaster is Mr James Davies. Former pupils of the school are known as "Old Hallifordians". The school's grounds are situated on the edge of Spelthorne, providing access from London, the major airports, the M3 and M4 motorways.

History
The building closest to its road is the oldest, a tall-storied Georgian House set in  beside the River Thames that was once home to Emma Hart (later Emma, Lady Hamilton) when she lived with Charles Francis Greville before she married and then became Lord Nelson's mistress.

The school has seen expansion since the year 2000 including the following buildings:
Professional theatre and separate dining hall
Arts and technology building
Sixth form centre and library
Multi-purpose sports hall, separate gymnasium and climbing wall

The fourth house was also added during this time, and additional sports fields were purchased.

Following a 2007 consortium with the now-closed St David's School for Girls, Halliford School admits girls from the age of 16.

Amenities and curriculum
Sports and athletics are significant throughout the year groups.  Boys from the school have played sports such as rugby, cricket and basketball to the highest level.  A major portion of alumni play for teams in or compete as individuals in rugby, cricket, football, badminton, rowing, athletics and/or golf at university, local or workplace clubs.  The inspectorate reports students are known by the staff who all provide major support outside of the school timetable.  A broad extra-curricular programme runs and ambitious, frequent overseas trips: academic, charity project based or sporting.

In early years the curriculum is broad with pupils exposed to a wide range of subjects to help them acquire a sound foundation of basic skills. At GCSE students unless exceptional requirements merit different options study English language, English Literature, Mathematics, the three Sciences, a modern language and ICT. AS and A-level courses can be taken in 25 non-vocational subjects: in the arts, languages, technologies and sciences.

Boys are encouraged to stay on into the sixth form and continue to university.

Numerous extra-curricular and student-organised clubs and societies include: a current affairs circle, a reading circle to encourage creative writing and a stage production technicians' group.  Competitions and performances are led by staff and sixth form pupils annually in junior and senior virtual investment trading, theatre and music.  External distinguished speakers give talks and presentations.

School Badge, Motto and Houses
The school badge was designed in 1986 at the request of the Headmaster, John Crook, by his Deputy Head, John Mitchell.   The blue chevron represents the Halliford Bend in the River Thames where the School is situated.  The origin of the word Halliford as derived from HOLY FORD is represented by the gold bar, or pallet (stripe), at the apex of the chevron.   The two gold crosses were copied from the finials of the churchwardens' staves in the parish church of St Nicholas, Shepperton, within which parish the School stands.  VADUM SANCTUM inscribed on the open book (for Education) is the Latin for "Holy Ford", and picks up the tradition that Julius Caesar crossed the Thames by way of an ancient ford hereabouts, and that in later Christian times a holy man or hermit lived at the end of Manygate Lane, close by the ancient crossing point.  The crest depicts a Holy Lamb couchant, illustrating the close links with Shepperton (Sheep Town).   The Motto, VIA FIRMA AD FIRMIORA, translates roughly as A FIRM PATH TO FIRMER THINGS.  It represents the School's aim to guide its pupils through the uncertain and turbulent waters of adolescence to the steadier ground of young manhood.

The school is divided into four houses:

Wadham 
Russell
Greville
Desborough

The house colours are red, green, blue and gold respectively, reflected in school ties and inter-house sports kit.

Financial support in the form of bursaries is provided for some of the school’s pupils.

Old Hallifordians
Alumni of Halliford school are known as Old Hallifordians or OHs.

Societies for former pupils include The Old Hallifordian Society. The Old Hallifordian Society is the alumni organisation for the school and was founded to further the interests of the school and its past and present members. Alumni become life members of the Society when they leave the school. The Old Hallifordian Society encourages interaction between members, strengthening ties between OHs and the school.

Old Hallifordians include old boys (and girls) in various professions, including Victoria Cross recipients, military officers, clergymen and politicians.

Notable alumni
Notable Old Hallifordians include actor Mark Lester; Olympic Gold medalist Stephen/Steve Trapmore (rowing); Olympians Toby Penty (badminton) and James Woodgate (archery); Paralympic rower Oliver Stanhope; rugby player Rhodri Williams and Horticulturalist Colin Squire OBE.

Assessment
The school is inspected by the ISI rather than Ofsted.  Inspections are carried out under Section 162A(1)(b) of the Education Act 2002 as amended by the Education Act 2005 under which the Secretary of State accredits the ISI as a qualified inspectorate body.

Considerable attention has been given to providing support for pupils with learning difficulties and for potential high achievers.

Students' achievements and the quality of their learning are good, as was apparent from their written work, in lessons and from public examination results. No differences in attainment relative to ability were noted between different groups of pupils so that the progress over time made by those of all abilities is good.

During the 2015/16 UCAS cycle 100% of pupils received 3 or more offers and 95% of all courses applied for have been successful.

Notes and references
Notes 
  
References
 

Private schools in Surrey